Krum Ivanov Yanev (9 January 1929 – 24 August 2012) was a Bulgarian footballer who played at both professional and international levels, as a forward.

Career
Yanev started his career with Spartak Plovdiv. In 1948–49 season he scored four goals in four matches for Lokomotiv Plovdiv and then joined Botev Plovdiv.

In 1950 Yanev joined CSKA Sofia. For the club he played 157 matches, scoring 50 goals. With CSKA Sofia, he won eight A Group titles and two Bulgarian Cups.

He earned 31 caps for Bulgaria, earning a bronze medal at the 1956 Summer Olympics; he also competed at the 1952 Summer Olympics.

References

1929 births
2012 deaths
Bulgarian footballers
Bulgaria international footballers
Olympic footballers of Bulgaria
Footballers at the 1952 Summer Olympics
Footballers at the 1956 Summer Olympics
Olympic bronze medalists for Bulgaria
Olympic medalists in football
First Professional Football League (Bulgaria) players
FC Spartak Plovdiv players
PFC Lokomotiv Plovdiv players
Botev Plovdiv players
PFC CSKA Sofia players
Association football forwards
Medalists at the 1956 Summer Olympics